Agapito "Butz" Aquino (May 20, 1939 – August 17, 2015) was a Senator of the Philippines from 1987 to 1995, congressman from Makati and a part-time film and television actor. He was born to former senator Benigno S. Aquino Sr. and Aurora Aquino-Aquino. He was the brother of former senators Benigno S. Aquino Jr. and Tessie Aquino-Oreta, as well as the uncle of Former President Benigno S. Aquino III and Former senator Paolo Benigno "Bam" Aquino IV.

Early life
Aquino was born at May 20, 1939. His father is the former senator Benigno Aquino Sr. and his mother is Aurora Aquino. His siblings are Benigno S. "Ninoy" Aquino Jr., Paul Aquino, Maria Teresa Aquino-Oreta, Maria Gerarda Aquino, Maria Guadalupe Aquino and, Maria Aurora Aquino.

Early career
He started out as an entrepreneur and was the President of Mofire Fiberglass Inc. from the 1970s until the 1980s. In that period, he wasn't interested in politics. He was said to be cynical about politics and believed that it was a "ballgame of the rich". He started participating in politics when his brother Ninoy, was assassinated on August 21, 1983 at Manila International Airport.

Political career
Under the administration of President Ferdinand Marcos, Agapito was one of the founders of the August Twenty One Movement (ATOM), Coalition of Organizations for the Restoration of Democracy (CORD) and Bansang Nagkakaisa sa Diwa at Layunin (BANDILA). Jejomar Binay was also one of the founders of ATOM as a legal counselor. Agapito became close friends with Binay as co-founders.

In 1987, he was elected to be a Senator of the Philippines and continued to be part of Senate in his 2nd election in 1992. He then became part of the House of Representatives when he was elected as the first representative of the 2nd District of Makati in 1998. He continued to be as a representative until his third term ended in 2007. In addition, he also was the Deputy Speaker for Luzon from November 2000 to January 2001 and the Minority Floor Leader from January 2001 to June 2001.

In 2010, he said in an interview with The Philippine Star that he had plans in returning to the Senate but after learning that his nephew, Benigno Aquino III, was one of the Liberal Party's candidate for president, he backed out and supported his nephew. He instead ran for Mayor of Makati as an independent candidate but lost to 1st district councilor Jejomar Binay Jr. After which, he never again pursued any political positions.

He was known for being an advocate of small farmers and of cooperative principles as he legislated the notable Magna Carta for Small Farmers, Seed Act, and the Cooperative Code of the Philippines.

Filmography

Film
 The Passionate Strangers (1966) - Julio Lazatin 
 Impossible Dream (1973) -  Atty. Barredo 
 The Last Reunion (1978) - Japanese General

Television series
Palos (2008) - Mr. President of the Philippines
I Heart You, Pare! (2011) - Mr. Henry Castillo

Death
Aquino died on August 17, 2015 while confined at the Cardinal Santos Medical Center, citing "natural causes", according to his nephew, Senator Bam Aquino. He was 76. His remains were cremated, brought to the Senate for a tribute on August 19, and laid to rest at St. Therese Columbarium in Pasay.

References

External links
Family and relatives of Agapito Aquino

1939 births
2015 deaths
Agapito
Members of the House of Representatives of the Philippines from Makati
Senators of the 9th Congress of the Philippines
Senators of the 8th Congress of the Philippines
Laban ng Demokratikong Pilipino politicians
People from San Juan, Metro Manila
Deputy Speakers of the House of Representatives of the Philippines
Filipino male film actors
Filipino male television actors